The 2015 season was the Minnesota Vikings' 55th season in the National Football League and their second under head coach Mike Zimmer. It marked the last season in which the Vikings played their home games at the University of Minnesota's on-campus TCF Bank Stadium, before moving into U.S. Bank Stadium, which opened in July 2016, located on the site of the now-demolished Hubert H. Humphrey Metrodome. The Vikings improved on their 7–9 record from 2014 and clinched a playoff berth for the first time since 2012. They also won their first NFC North title since 2009 with a Week 17 victory at the Packers. As a result, they hosted the Seattle Seahawks in the wild card round of the 2015–16 NFL playoffs, but lost 10–9 after kicker Blair Walsh missed a potential game-winning 27-yard field goal in the final seconds.

Offseason

Draft

Roster changes

Preseason

Schedule
On February 11, 2015, the National Football League announced that the Vikings would play the Pittsburgh Steelers in the Pro Football Hall of Fame Game. The game was played at Tom Benson Hall of Fame Stadium in Canton, Ohio, on Sunday, August 9. The remainder of the Vikings' preliminary preseason schedule was announced on April 9. The Vikings first hosted the Tampa Bay Buccaneers and the Oakland Raiders before road games against the Dallas Cowboys and the Tennessee Titans, making this the third consecutive year in which the Vikings face the Titans in the preseason.

Game summaries

Hall of Fame Game: vs. Pittsburgh Steelers

Week 1: vs. Tampa Bay Buccaneers

Week 2: vs. Oakland Raiders

Week 3: at Dallas Cowboys

Week 4: at Tennessee Titans

Regular season

Schedule
The Vikings' 2015 schedule was announced on April 21.

Note: Intra-division opponents are in bold text.

Game summaries

Week 1: at San Francisco 49ers

The Vikings opened their 2015 season on the road against the San Francisco 49ers. Despite allowing San Francisco to start with the ball, the Vikings made a positive start, as Andrew Sendejo blocked a 28-yard field goal attempt from Phil Dawson, which Marcus Sherels returned 44 yards to the San Francisco 26-yard line. Minnesota QB Teddy Bridgewater was unable to complete a single pass on the next drive, forcing Blair Walsh to attempt a 44-yard field goal; however, he pushed it wide right. After forcing the 49ers to punt on the next series, the Vikings were themselves forced to punt immediately afterwards, only for the 49ers' rookie former rugby league star Jarryd Hayne to muff the catch, allowing the Vikings to recover the ball. The next drive saw the Vikings attempt to convert on 4th-and-3, but Bridgewater's completed pass to tight end Kyle Rudolph fell a yard short of a fresh set of downs.

Both sides exchanged punts at the start of the second quarter, with the 49ers eventually returning one 85 yards for a touchdown, only for it to be called back for an illegal block by a San Francisco player. However, the ensuing possession ended with a 49ers touchdown, as they drove 93 yards in just under 5 minutes, before Carlos Hyde finished the series with a 10-yard touchdown run; after finding nowhere to go on his initial run to the right, he beat a Minnesota defender with a spin move and ran back to the left side of the field, where quarterback Colin Kaepernick led him into the end zone. With the Vikings unable to score in the remaining 47 seconds, the first half ended 7–0 to San Francisco.

Minnesota started the third quarter with the ball, but they were unable to make it out of their half before being forced to punt. The 49ers then extended their lead on the ensuing possession, driving 73 yards to the Minnesota 11-yard line to set up a 30-yard field goal attempt for Dawson. The Vikings finally got on the scoreboard early in the fourth quarter, as Walsh finished off a 66-yard drive with a 37-yard field goal, but the 49ers pulled further ahead with a second touchdown for Hyde on a 17-yard run. Bridgewater attempted to spark the Vikings back into the game, but a deep pass intended for Rudolph was intercepted by Tramaine Brock, setting up a 25-yard field goal for Dawson. The next drive saw the Vikings go for it again on 4th-and-8, but Bridgewater was sacked for a loss of 14 yards, allowing the 49ers to kneel out the game.

Week 2: vs. Detroit Lions

Week 3: vs. San Diego Chargers

Week 4: at Denver Broncos

Week 6: vs. Kansas City Chiefs

Week 7: at Detroit Lions

Week 8: at Chicago Bears

Week 9: vs. St. Louis Rams

Week 10: at Oakland Raiders

Week 11: vs. Green Bay Packers

Week 12: at Atlanta Falcons

Week 13: vs. Seattle Seahawks

Week 14: at Arizona Cardinals

Week 15: vs. Chicago Bears

Teddy Bridgewater's best game of his career, going 17/20, 231 yards, and 4 touchdowns, along with a rushing touchdown on the ground. Before this game, Bridgewater had only 9 passing touchdowns, and afterwards, he had 13. Jay Cutler and the Chicago Bears were stopped to 17 points, while Cutler also having a good game with 26/37 for 231 and 2 touchdowns.

Week 16: vs. New York Giants

Week 17: at Green Bay Packers

Standings

Division

Conference

Postseason

Schedule

Game summaries

NFC Wild Card Playoffs: vs. #6 Seattle Seahawks

The Vikings' only points in this game came from the foot of kicker Blair Walsh, whose three field goals put them 9–0 up by the end of the third quarter; however, Seattle outscored them 10–0 in the final period, with a touchdown catch from Doug Baldwin being followed by a 46-yard Steven Hauschka field goal in the first seven minutes of the quarter. The Vikings had a chance to win it with 20 seconds remaining, but Walsh missed a 27-yard field goal, reminding Vikings fans of Gary Anderson's missed field goal in the 1998 NFC Championship Game.

Pro Bowl
Running back Adrian Peterson was the only Minnesota Viking selected for the 2016 Pro Bowl. It was Peterson's seventh Pro Bowl selection, tying him for the fourth-most in Vikings franchise history with offensive tackle Ron Yary. After Houston Texans DE J. J. Watt suffered an injury in the wildcard round game against the Kansas City Chiefs, Vikings defensive end Everson Griffen was called up to replace him, his first career Pro Bowl selection. Griffen was followed by a fellow first-time Pro Bowler, safety Harrison Smith, on January 25, after Earl Thomas of the Seattle Seahawks was ruled out of the game due to injury. The next day, quarterback Teddy Bridgewater and linebacker Anthony Barr were added to the Pro Bowl roster as replacements for injured Arizona Cardinals quarterback Carson Palmer and New England Patriots linebacker Jamie Collins respectively.

Roster

Staff

Statistics

Team leaders

Source: Minnesota Vikings' official website

League rankings

Source: NFL.com.

Notes

References

External links

Minnesota
Minnesota Vikings seasons
Minnesota Vikings
NFC North championship seasons